Amonte is a surname. Notable people with this surname include:

 Kelly Amonte Hiller, American lacrosse player and coach
 Tony Amonte (born 1970), American ice hockey player, brother of Kelly

See also
 Amontes, genus of moths